Pythagoras of Samos (or simply ;  in Ionian Greek) was an ancient Ionian Greek philosopher and the eponymous founder of Pythagoreanism. His political and religious teachings were well known in Magna Graecia and influenced the philosophies of Plato, Aristotle, and, through them, the West in general. Knowledge of his life is clouded by legend, but he appears to have been the son of Mnesarchus, a gem-engraver on the island of Samos. Modern scholars disagree regarding Pythagoras's education and influences, but they do agree that, around 530 BC, he travelled to Croton in southern Italy, where he founded a school in which initiates were sworn to secrecy and lived a communal, ascetic lifestyle. This lifestyle entailed a number of dietary prohibitions, traditionally said to have included vegetarianism, although modern scholars doubt that he ever advocated complete vegetarianism.

The teaching most securely identified with Pythagoras is metempsychosis, or the "transmigration of souls", which holds that every soul is immortal and, upon death, enters into a new body. He may have also devised the doctrine of musica universalis, which holds that the planets move according to mathematical equations and thus resonate to produce an inaudible symphony of music. Scholars debate whether Pythagoras developed the numerological and musical teachings attributed to him, or if those teachings were developed by his later followers, particularly Philolaus of Croton. Following Croton's decisive victory over Sybaris in around 510 BC, Pythagoras's followers came into conflict with supporters of democracy, and Pythagorean meeting houses were burned. Pythagoras may have been killed during this persecution, or he may have escaped to Metapontum and died there.

In antiquity, Pythagoras was credited with many mathematical and scientific discoveries, including the Pythagorean theorem, Pythagorean tuning, the five regular solids, the Theory of Proportions, the sphericity of the Earth, and the identity of the morning and evening stars as the planet Venus. It was said that he was the first man to call himself a philosopher ("lover of wisdom") and that he was the first to divide the globe into five climatic zones. Classical historians debate whether Pythagoras made these discoveries, and many of the accomplishments credited to him likely originated earlier or were made by his colleagues or successors. Some accounts mention that the philosophy associated with Pythagoras was related to mathematics and that numbers were important, but it is debated to what extent, if at all, he actually contributed to mathematics or natural philosophy.

Pythagoras influenced Plato, whose dialogues, especially his Timaeus, exhibit Pythagorean teachings. Pythagorean ideas on mathematical perfection also impacted ancient Greek art. His teachings underwent a major revival in the first century BC among Middle Platonists, coinciding with the rise of Neopythagoreanism. Pythagoras continued to be regarded as a great philosopher throughout the Middle Ages and his philosophy had a major impact on scientists such as Nicolaus Copernicus, Johannes Kepler, and Isaac Newton. Pythagorean symbolism was used throughout early modern European esotericism, and his teachings as portrayed in Ovid's Metamorphoses influenced the modern vegetarian movement.

Biographical sources 
No authentic writings of Pythagoras have survived, and almost nothing is known for certain about his life. The earliest sources on Pythagoras's life are brief, ambiguous, and often satirical. The earliest source on Pythagoras's teachings is a satirical poem probably written after his death by Xenophanes of Colophon, who had been one of his contemporaries. In the poem, Xenophanes describes Pythagoras interceding on behalf of a dog that is being beaten, professing to recognize in its cries the voice of a departed friend. Alcmaeon of Croton, a doctor who lived in Croton at around the same time Pythagoras lived there, incorporates many Pythagorean teachings into his writings and alludes to having possibly known Pythagoras personally. The poet Heraclitus of Ephesus, who was born across a few miles of sea away from Samos and may have lived within Pythagoras's lifetime, mocked Pythagoras as a clever charlatan, remarking that "Pythagoras, son of Mnesarchus, practiced inquiry more than any other man, and selecting from these writings he manufactured a wisdom for himself—much learning, artful knavery."

The Greek poets Ion of Chios and Empedocles of Acragas both express admiration for Pythagoras in their poems. The first concise description of Pythagoras comes from the historian Herodotus of Halicarnassus, who describes him as "not the most insignificant" of Greek sages and states that Pythagoras taught his followers how to attain immortality. The accuracy of the works of Herodotus is controversial.  The writings attributed to the Pythagorean philosopher Philolaus of Croton, who lived in the late fifth century BC, are the earliest texts to describe the numerological and musical theories that were later ascribed to Pythagoras. The Athenian rhetorician Isocrates (436–338 BC) was the first to describe Pythagoras as having visited Egypt. Aristotle wrote a treatise On the Pythagoreans, which is no longer extant. Some of it may be preserved in the Protrepticus. Aristotle's disciples Dicaearchus, Aristoxenus, and Heraclides Ponticus also wrote on the same subject.

Most of the major sources on Pythagoras's life are from the Roman period, by which point, according to the German classicist Walter Burkert, "the history of Pythagoreanism was already... the laborious reconstruction of something lost and gone." Three ancient biographies of Pythagoras have survived from late antiquity, all of which are filled primarily with myths and legends. The earliest and most respectable of these is the one from Diogenes Laërtius's Lives and Opinions of Eminent Philosophers. The two later biographies were written by the Neoplatonist philosophers Porphyry and Iamblichus and were partially intended as polemics against the rise of Christianity. The later sources are much lengthier than the earlier ones, and even more fantastic in their descriptions of Pythagoras's achievements. Porphyry and Iamblichus used material from the lost writings of Aristotle's disciples and material taken from these sources is generally considered to be the most reliable.

Life

Early life 

Herodotus, Isocrates, and other early writers agree that Pythagoras was the son of Mnesarchus, and that he was born on the Greek island of Samos in the eastern Aegean. According to these biographers, Pythagoras' father wasn't born on the island, although he got naturalized there, but according to Iamblichus he was a native of the island. He is said to have been a gem-engraver or a wealthy merchant, but his ancestry is disputed and unclear. His mother was a native of Samos, descending from a geomoroi family. Apollonius of Tyana, gives her name as Pythaïs. Iamblichus tells the story that the Pythia prophesied to her while she was pregnant with him that she would give birth to a man supremely beautiful, wise, and beneficial to humankind. As to the date of his birth, Aristoxenus stated that Pythagoras left Samos in the reign of Polycrates, at the age of 40, which would give a date of birth around 570 BC. Pythagoras's name led him to be associated with Pythian Apollo; Aristippus of Cyrene in the 4th century BC explained his name by saying, "He spoke [, ] the truth no less than did the Pythian [ ]".

During Pythagoras's formative years, Samos was a thriving cultural hub known for its feats of advanced architectural engineering, including the building of the Tunnel of Eupalinos, and for its riotous festival culture. It was a major center of trade in the Aegean where traders brought goods from the Near East. According to Christiane L. Joost-Gaugier, these traders almost certainly brought with them Near Eastern ideas and traditions. Pythagoras's early life also coincided with the flowering of early Ionian natural philosophy. He was a contemporary of the philosophers Anaximander, Anaximenes, and the historian Hecataeus, all of whom lived in Miletus, across the sea from Samos.

Reputed travels 

Pythagoras is traditionally thought to have received most of his education in the Near East. Modern scholarship has shown that the culture of Archaic Greece was heavily influenced by those of Levantine and Mesopotamian cultures. Like many other important Greek thinkers, Pythagoras was said to have studied in Egypt. By the time of Isocrates in the fourth century BC, Pythagoras's reputed studies in Egypt were already taken as fact. The writer Antiphon, who may have lived during the Hellenistic Era, claimed in his lost work On Men of Outstanding Merit, used as a source by Porphyry, that Pythagoras learned to speak Egyptian from the Pharaoh Amasis II himself, that he studied with the Egyptian priests at Diospolis (Thebes), and that he was the only foreigner ever to be granted the privilege of taking part in their worship. The Middle Platonist biographer Plutarch writes in his treatise On Isis and Osiris that, during his visit to Egypt, Pythagoras received instruction from the Egyptian priest Oenuphis of Heliopolis (meanwhile Solon received lectures from a Sonchis of Sais). According to the Christian theologian Clement of Alexandria, "Pythagoras was a disciple of Soches, an Egyptian archprophet, as well as Plato of Sechnuphis of Heliopolis." Some ancient writers claimed that Pythagoras learned geometry and the doctrine of metempsychosis from the Egyptians.

Other ancient writers, however, claimed that Pythagoras had learned these teachings from the Magi in Persia or even from Zoroaster himself. Diogenes Laërtius asserts that Pythagoras later visited Crete, where he went to the Cave of Ida with Epimenides. The Phoenicians are reputed to have taught Pythagoras arithmetic and the Chaldeans to have taught him astronomy. By the third century BC, Pythagoras was already reported to have studied under the Jews as well. Contradicting all these reports, the novelist Antonius Diogenes, writing in the second century BC, reports that Pythagoras discovered all his doctrines himself by interpreting dreams. The third-century AD Sophist Philostratus claims that, in addition to the Egyptians, Pythagoras also studied under sages or gymnosophists in India. Iamblichus expands this list even further by claiming that Pythagoras also studied with the Celts and Iberians.

Alleged Greek teachers 

Ancient sources also record Pythagoras having studied under a variety of native Greek thinkers. Some identify Hermodamas of Samos as a possible tutor. Hermodamas represented the indigenous Samian rhapsodic tradition and his father Creophylos was said to have been the host of his rival poet Homer. Others credit Bias of Priene, Thales, or Anaximander (a pupil of Thales). Other traditions claim the mythic bard Orpheus as Pythagoras's teacher, thus representing the Orphic Mysteries. The Neoplatonists wrote of a "sacred discourse" Pythagoras had written on the gods in the Doric Greek dialect, which they believed had been dictated to Pythagoras by the Orphic priest Aglaophamus upon his initiation to the orphic Mysteries at Leibethra. Iamblichus credited Orpheus with having been the model for Pythagoras's manner of speech, his spiritual attitude, and his manner of worship. Iamblichus describes Pythagoreanism as a synthesis of everything Pythagoras had learned from Orpheus, from the Egyptian priests, from the Eleusinian Mysteries, and from other religious and philosophical traditions. Riedweg states that, although these stories are fanciful, Pythagoras's teachings were definitely influenced by Orphism to a noteworthy extent.

Of the various Greek sages claimed to have taught Pythagoras, Pherecydes of Syros is mentioned most often. Similar miracle stories were told about both Pythagoras and Pherecydes, including one in which the hero predicts a shipwreck, one in which he predicts the conquest of Messina, and one in which he drinks from a well and predicts an earthquake. Apollonius Paradoxographus, a paradoxographer who may have lived in the second century BC, identified Pythagoras's thaumaturgic ideas as a result of Pherecydes's influence. Another story, which may be traced to the Neopythagorean philosopher Nicomachus, tells that, when Pherecydes was old and dying on the island of Delos, Pythagoras returned to care for him and pay his respects. Duris, the historian and tyrant of Samos, is reported to have patriotically boasted of an epitaph supposedly penned by Pherecydes which declared that Pythagoras's wisdom exceeded his own. On the grounds of all these references connecting Pythagoras with Pherecydes, Riedweg concludes that there may well be some historical foundation to the tradition that Pherecydes was Pythagoras's teacher. Pythagoras and Pherecydes also appear to have shared similar views on the soul and the teaching of metempsychosis.

Before 520 BC, on one of his visits to Egypt or Greece, Pythagoras might have met Thales of Miletus, who would have been around fifty-four years older than him. Thales was a philosopher, scientist, mathematician, and engineer, also known for a special case of the inscribed angle theorem. Pythagoras's birthplace, the island of Samos, is situated in the Northeast Aegean Sea not far from Miletus. Diogenes Laërtius cites a statement from Aristoxenus (fourth century BC) stating that Pythagoras learned most of his moral doctrines from the Delphic priestess Themistoclea. Porphyry agrees with this assertion, but calls the priestess Aristoclea (Aristokleia). Ancient authorities furthermore note the similarities between the religious and ascetic peculiarities of Pythagoras with the Orphic or Cretan mysteries, or the Delphic oracle.

In Croton 

Porphyry repeats an account from Antiphon, who reported that, while he was still on Samos, Pythagoras founded a school known as the "semicircle". Here, Samians debated matters of public concern. Supposedly, the school became so renowned that the brightest minds in all of Greece came to Samos to hear Pythagoras teach. Pythagoras himself dwelled in a secret cave, where he studied in private and occasionally held discourses with a few of his close friends. Christoph Riedweg, a German scholar of early Pythagoreanism, states that it is entirely possible Pythagoras may have taught on Samos, but cautions that Antiphon's account, which makes reference to a specific building that was still in use during his own time, appears to be motivated by Samian patriotic interest.

Around 530 BC, when Pythagoras was about forty years old, he left Samos. His later admirers claimed that he left because he disagreed with the tyranny of Polycrates in Samos, Riedweg notes that this explanation closely aligns with Nicomachus's emphasis on Pythagoras's purported love of freedom, but that Pythagoras's enemies portrayed him as having a proclivity towards tyranny. Other accounts claim that Pythagoras left Samos because he was so overburdened with public duties in Samos, because of the high estimation in which he was held by his fellow-citizens. He arrived in the Greek colony of Croton (today's Crotone, in Calabria) in what was then Magna Graecia. All sources agree that Pythagoras was charismatic and quickly acquired great political influence in his new environment. He served as an advisor to the elites in Croton and gave them frequent advice. Later biographers tell fantastical stories of the effects of his eloquent speeches in leading the people of Croton to abandon their luxurious and corrupt way of life and devote themselves to the purer system which he came to introduce.

Family and friends 

Diogenes Laërtius states that Pythagoras "did not indulge in the pleasures of love" and that he cautioned others to only have sex "whenever you are willing to be weaker than yourself". According to Porphyry, Pythagoras married Theano, a lady of Crete and the daughter of Pythenax and had several children with her. Porphyry writes that Pythagoras had two sons named Telauges and Arignote, and a daughter named Myia, who "took precedence among the maidens in Croton and, when a wife, among married women." Iamblichus mentions none of these children and instead only mentions a son named Mnesarchus after his grandfather. This son was raised by Pythagoras's appointed successor Aristaeus and eventually took over the school when Aristaeus was too old to continue running it. Suda writes that Pythagoras had 4 children (Telauges, Mnesarchus, Myia and Arignote).

The wrestler Milo of Croton was said to have been a close associate of Pythagoras and was credited with having saved the philosopher's life when a roof was about to collapse. This association may have been the result of confusion with a different man named Pythagoras, who was an athletics trainer. Diogenes Laërtius records Milo's wife's name as Myia. Iamblichus mentions Theano as the wife of Brontinus of Croton. Diogenes Laërtius states that the same Theano was Pythagoras's pupil and that Pythagoras's wife Theano was her daughter. Diogenes Laërtius also records that works supposedly written by Theano were still extant during his own lifetime and quotes several opinions attributed to her. These writings are now known to be pseudepigraphical.

Death 
Pythagoras's emphasis on dedication and asceticism are credited with aiding in Croton's decisive victory over the neighboring colony of Sybaris in 510 BC. After the victory, some prominent citizens of Croton proposed a democratic constitution, which the Pythagoreans rejected. The supporters of democracy, headed by Cylon and Ninon, the former of whom is said to have been irritated by his exclusion from Pythagoras's brotherhood, roused the populace against them. Followers of Cylon and Ninon attacked the Pythagoreans during one of their meetings, either in the house of Milo or in some other meeting-place. Accounts of the attack are often contradictory and many probably confused it with later anti-Pythagorean rebellions. The building was apparently set on fire, and many of the assembled members perished; only the younger and more active members managed to escape.

Sources disagree regarding whether Pythagoras was present when the attack occurred and, if he was, whether or not he managed to escape. In some accounts, Pythagoras was not at the meeting when the Pythagoreans were attacked because he was on Delos tending to the dying Pherecydes. According to another account from Dicaearchus, Pythagoras was at the meeting and managed to escape, leading a small group of followers to the nearby city of Locris, where they pleaded for sanctuary, but were denied. They reached the city of Metapontum, where they took shelter in the temple of the Muses and died there of starvation after forty days without food. Another tale recorded by Porphyry claims that, as Pythagoras's enemies were burning the house, his devoted students laid down on the ground to make a path for him to escape by walking over their bodies across the flames like a bridge. Pythagoras managed to escape, but was so despondent at the deaths of his beloved students that he committed suicide. A different legend reported by both Diogenes Laërtius and Iamblichus states that Pythagoras almost managed to escape, but that he came to a fava bean field and refused to run through it, since doing so would violate his teachings, so he stopped instead and was killed. This story seems to have originated from the writer Neanthes, who told it about later Pythagoreans, not about Pythagoras himself.

Teachings

Metempsychosis 

Although the exact details of Pythagoras's teachings are uncertain, it is possible to reconstruct a general outline of his main ideas. Aristotle writes at length about the teachings of the Pythagoreans, but without mentioning Pythagoras directly. One of Pythagoras's main doctrines appears to have been metempsychosis, the belief that all souls are immortal and that, after death, a soul is transferred into a new body. This teaching is referenced by Xenophanes, Ion of Chios, and Herodotus. Nothing whatsoever, however, is known about the nature or mechanism by which Pythagoras believed metempsychosis to occur.

Empedocles alludes in one of his poems that Pythagoras may have claimed to possess the ability to recall his former incarnations. Diogenes Laërtius reports an account from Heraclides Ponticus that Pythagoras told people that he had lived four previous lives that he could remember in detail. The first of these lives was as Aethalides the son of Hermes, who granted him the ability to remember all his past incarnations. Next, he was incarnated as Euphorbus, a minor hero from the Trojan War briefly mentioned in the Iliad. He then became the philosopher Hermotimus, who recognized the shield of Euphorbus in the temple of Apollo. His final incarnation was as Pyrrhus, a fisherman from Delos. One of his past lives, as reported by Dicaearchus, was as a beautiful courtesan.

Mysticism 
Another belief attributed to Pythagoras was that of the "harmony of the spheres", which maintained that the planets and stars move according to mathematical equations, which correspond to musical notes and thus produce an inaudible symphony. According to Porphyry, Pythagoras taught that the seven Muses were actually the seven planets singing together. In his philosophical dialogue Protrepticus, Aristotle has his literary double say:

Pythagoras was said to have practiced divination and prophecy. In the visits to various places in Greece—Delos, Sparta, Phlius, Crete, etc.—which are ascribed to him, he usually appears either in his religious or priestly guise, or else as a lawgiver.

Pythagoras and his followers reportedly had a spiritual practice known as "smoke trapping". This involved entering an enclosed space, typically a cave, and lighting a fire until noxious fumes filled the room. They would inhale the smoke and would experience vivid hallucinations due to oxygen deprivation and hypercapnia. They supposedly would see divine geometric shapes and patterns which they would copy onto the walls with charcoal to be analyzed at a later point.

Numerology 

According to Aristotle, the Pythagoreans used mathematics for solely mystical reasons, devoid of practical application. They believed that all things were made of numbers. The number one (the monad) represented the origin of all things and the number two (the dyad) represented matter. The number three was an "ideal number" because it had a beginning, middle, and end and was the smallest number of points that could be used to define a plane triangle, which they revered as a symbol of the god Apollo. The number four signified the four seasons and the four elements. The number seven was also sacred because it was the number of planets and the number of strings on a lyre, and because Apollo's birthday was celebrated on the seventh day of each month. They believed that odd numbers were masculine, that even numbers were feminine, and that the number five represented marriage, because it was the sum of two and three.

Ten was regarded as the "perfect number" and the Pythagoreans honored it by never gathering in groups larger than ten. Pythagoras was credited with devising the tetractys, the triangular figure of four rows which add up to the perfect number, ten. The Pythagoreans regarded the tetractys as a symbol of utmost mystical importance. Iamblichus, in his Life of Pythagoras, states that the tetractys was "so admirable, and so divinised by those who understood [it]," that Pythagoras's students would swear oaths by it. Andrew Gregory concludes that the tradition linking Pythagoras to the tetractys is probably genuine.

Modern scholars debate whether these numerological teachings were developed by Pythagoras himself or by the later Pythagorean philosopher Philolaus of Croton. In his landmark study Lore and Science in Ancient Pythagoreanism, Walter Burkert argues that Pythagoras was a charismatic political and religious teacher, but that the number philosophy attributed to him was really an innovation by Philolaus. According to Burkert, Pythagoras never dealt with numbers at all, let alone made any noteworthy contribution to mathematics. Burkert argues that the only mathematics the Pythagoreans ever actually engaged in was simple, proofless arithmetic, but that these arithmetic discoveries did contribute significantly to the beginnings of mathematics.

Pythagoreanism

Communal lifestyle 

Both Plato and Isocrates state that, above all else, Pythagoras was known as the founder of a new way of life. The organization Pythagoras founded at Croton was called a "school", but, in many ways, resembled a monastery. The adherents were bound by a vow to Pythagoras and each other, for the purpose of pursuing the religious and ascetic observances, and of studying his religious and philosophical theories. The members of the sect shared all their possessions in common and were devoted to each other to the exclusion of outsiders. Ancient sources record that the Pythagoreans ate meals in common after the manner of the Spartans. One Pythagorean maxim was "koinà tà phílōn" ("All things in common among friends"). Both Iamblichus and Porphyry provide detailed accounts of the organization of the school, although the primary interest of both writers is not historical accuracy, but rather to present Pythagoras as a divine figure, sent by the gods to benefit humankind. Iamblichus, in particular, presents the "Pythagorean Way of Life" as a pagan alternative to the Christian monastic communities of his own time.

Two groups existed within early Pythagoreanism: the mathematikoi ("learners") and the akousmatikoi ("listeners"). The akousmatikoi are traditionally identified by scholars as "old believers" in mysticism, numerology, and religious teachings; whereas the mathematikoi are traditionally identified as a more intellectual, modernist faction who were more rationalist and scientific. Gregory cautions that there was probably not a sharp distinction between them and that many Pythagoreans probably believed the two approaches were compatible. The study of mathematics and music may have been connected to the worship of Apollo. The Pythagoreans believed that music was a purification for the soul, just as medicine was a purification for the body. One anecdote of Pythagoras reports that when he encountered some drunken youths trying to break into the home of a virtuous woman, he sang a solemn tune with long spondees and the boys' "raging willfulness" was quelled. The Pythagoreans also placed particular emphasis on the importance of physical exercise; therapeutic dancing, daily morning walks along scenic routes, and athletics were major components of the Pythagorean lifestyle. Moments of contemplation at the beginning and end of each day were also advised.

Prohibitions and regulations 

Pythagorean teachings were known as "symbols" (symbola) and members took a vow of silence that they would not reveal these symbols to non-members. Those who did not obey the laws of the community were expelled and the remaining members would erect tombstones for them as though they had died. A number of "oral sayings" (akoúsmata) attributed to Pythagoras have survived, dealing with how members of the Pythagorean community should perform sacrifices, how they should honor the gods, how they should "move from here", and how they should be buried. Many of these sayings emphasize the importance of ritual purity and avoiding defilement. For instance, a saying which Leonid Zhmud concludes can probably be genuinely traced back to Pythagoras himself forbids his followers from wearing woolen garments. Other extant oral sayings forbid Pythagoreans from breaking bread, poking fires with swords, or picking up crumbs and teach that a person should always put the right sandal on before the left. The exact meanings of these sayings, however, are frequently obscure. Iamblichus preserves Aristotle's descriptions of the original, ritualistic intentions behind a few of these sayings, but these apparently later fell out of fashion, because Porphyry provides markedly different ethical-philosophical interpretations of them:

New initiates were allegedly not permitted to meet Pythagoras until after they had completed a five-year initiation period, during which they were required to remain silent. Sources indicate that Pythagoras himself was unusually progressive in his attitudes towards women and female members of Pythagoras's school appear to have played an active role in its operations. Iamblichus provides a list of 235 famous Pythagoreans, seventeen of whom are women. In later times, many prominent female philosophers contributed to the development of Neopythagoreanism.

Pythagoreanism also entailed a number of dietary prohibitions. It is more or less agreed that Pythagoras issued a prohibition against the consumption of fava beans and the meat of non-sacrificial animals such as fish and poultry. Both of these assumptions, however, have been contradicted. Pythagorean dietary restrictions may have been motivated by belief in the doctrine of metempsychosis. Some ancient writers present Pythagoras as enforcing a strictly vegetarian diet. Eudoxus of Cnidus, a student of Archytas, writes, "Pythagoras was distinguished by such purity and so avoided killing and killers that he not only abstained from animal foods, but even kept his distance from cooks and hunters." Other authorities contradict this statement. According to Aristoxenus, Pythagoras allowed the use of all kinds of animal food except the flesh of oxen used for ploughing, and rams. According to Heraclides Ponticus, Pythagoras ate the meat from sacrifices and established a diet for athletes dependent on meat.

Legends 

Within his own lifetime, Pythagoras was already the subject of elaborate hagiographic legends. Aristotle described Pythagoras as a wonder-worker and somewhat of a supernatural figure. In a fragment, Aristotle writes that Pythagoras had a golden thigh, which he publicly exhibited at the Olympic Games and showed to Abaris the Hyperborean as proof of his identity as the "Hyperborean Apollo". Supposedly, the priest of Apollo gave Pythagoras a magic arrow, which he used to fly over long distances and perform ritual purifications. He was supposedly once seen at both Metapontum and Croton at the same time. When Pythagoras crossed the river Kosas (the modern-day Basento), "several witnesses" reported that they heard it greet him by name. In Roman times, a legend claimed that Pythagoras was the son of Apollo. According to Muslim tradition, Pythagoras was said to have been initiated by Hermes (Egyptian Thoth).

Pythagoras was said to have dressed all in white. He is also said to have borne a golden wreath atop his head and to have worn trousers after the fashion of the Thracians. Diogenes Laërtius presents Pythagoras as having exercised remarkable self-control; he was always cheerful, but "abstained wholly from laughter, and from all such indulgences as jests and idle stories". Pythagoras was said to have had extraordinary success in dealing with animals. A fragment from Aristotle records that, when a deadly snake bit Pythagoras, he bit it back and killed it. Both Porphyry and Iamblichus report that Pythagoras once persuaded a bull not to eat fava beans and that he once convinced a notoriously destructive bear to swear that it would never harm a living thing again, and that the bear kept its word.

Riedweg suggests that Pythagoras may have personally encouraged these legends, but Gregory states that there is no direct evidence of this. Anti-Pythagorean legends were also circulated. Diogenes Laërtes retells a story told by Hermippus of Samos, which states that Pythagoras had once gone into an underground room, telling everyone that he was descending to the underworld. He stayed in this room for months, while his mother secretly recorded everything that happened during his absence. After he returned from this room, Pythagoras recounted everything that had happened while he was gone, convincing everyone that he had really been in the underworld and leading them to trust him with their wives.

Attributed discoveries

In mathematics 

Although Pythagoras is most famous today for his alleged mathematical discoveries, classical historians dispute whether he himself ever actually made any significant contributions to the field. Many mathematical and scientific discoveries were attributed to Pythagoras, including his famous theorem, as well as discoveries in the fields of music, astronomy, and medicine. Since at least the first century BC, Pythagoras has commonly been given credit for discovering the Pythagorean theorem, a theorem in geometry that states that "in a right-angled triangle the square of the hypotenuse is equal [to the sum of] the squares of the two other sides"—that is, . According to a popular legend, after he discovered this theorem, Pythagoras sacrificed an ox, or possibly even a whole hecatomb, to the gods. Cicero rejected this story as spurious because of the much more widely held belief that Pythagoras forbade blood sacrifices. Porphyry attempted to explain the story by asserting that the ox was actually made of dough.

The Pythagorean theorem was known and used by the Babylonians and Indians centuries before Pythagoras, but he may have been the first to introduce it to the Greeks. Some historians of mathematics have even suggested that he—or his students—may have constructed the first proof. Burkert rejects this suggestion as implausible, noting that Pythagoras was never credited with having proved any theorem in antiquity. Furthermore, the manner in which the Babylonians employed Pythagorean numbers implies that they knew that the principle was generally applicable, and knew some kind of proof, which has not yet been found in the (still largely unpublished) cuneiform sources. Pythagoras's biographers state that he also was the first to identify the five regular solids and that he was the first to discover the Theory of Proportions.

In music 

According to legend, Pythagoras discovered that musical notes could be translated into mathematical equations when he passed blacksmiths at work one day and heard the sound of their hammers clanging against the anvils. Thinking that the sounds of the hammers were beautiful and harmonious, except for one, he rushed into the blacksmith shop and began testing the hammers. He then realized that the tune played when the hammer struck was directly proportional to the size of the hammer and therefore concluded that music was mathematical.

In astronomy 
In ancient times, Pythagoras and his contemporary Parmenides of Elea were both credited with having been the first to teach that the Earth was spherical, the first to divide the globe into five climatic zones, and the first to identify the morning star and the evening star as the same celestial object (now known as Venus). Of the two philosophers, Parmenides has a much stronger claim to having been the first and the attribution of these discoveries to Pythagoras seems to have possibly originated from a pseudepigraphal poem. Empedocles, who lived in Magna Graecia shortly after Pythagoras and Parmenides, knew that the earth was spherical. By the end of the fifth century BC, this fact was universally accepted among Greek intellectuals. The identity of the morning star and evening star was known to the Babylonians over a thousand years earlier.

Later influence in antiquity

On Greek philosophy 

Sizeable Pythagorean communities existed in Magna Graecia, Phlius, and Thebes during the early fourth century BC. Around the same time, the Pythagorean philosopher Archytas was highly influential on the politics of the city of Tarentum in Magna Graecia. According to later tradition, Archytas was elected as strategos ("general") seven times, even though others were prohibited from serving more than a year. Archytas was also a renowned mathematician and musician. He was a close friend of Plato and he is quoted in Plato's Republic. Aristotle states that the philosophy of Plato was heavily dependent on the teachings of the Pythagoreans. Cicero repeats this statement, remarking that Platonem ferunt didicisse Pythagorea omnia ("They say Plato learned all things Pythagorean"). According to Charles H. Kahn, Plato's middle dialogues, including Meno, Phaedo, and The Republic, have a strong "Pythagorean coloring", and his last few dialogues (particularly Philebus and Timaeus) are extremely Pythagorean in character.

According to R. M. Hare, Plato's Republic may be partially based on the "tightly organised community of like-minded thinkers" established by Pythagoras at Croton. Additionally, Plato may have borrowed from Pythagoras the idea that mathematics and abstract thought are a secure basis for philosophy, science, and morality. Plato and Pythagoras shared a "mystical approach to the soul and its place in the material world" and it is probable that both were influenced by Orphism. The historian of philosophy Frederick Copleston states that Plato probably borrowed his tripartite theory of the soul from the Pythagoreans. Bertrand Russell, in his A History of Western Philosophy, contends that the influence of Pythagoras on Plato and others was so great that he should be considered the most influential philosopher of all time. He concludes that "I do not know of any other man who has been as influential as he was in the school of thought."

A revival of Pythagorean teachings occurred in the first century BC when Middle Platonist philosophers such as Eudorus and Philo of Alexandria hailed the rise of a "new" Pythagoreanism in Alexandria. At around the same time, Neopythagoreanism became prominent. The first-century AD philosopher Apollonius of Tyana sought to emulate Pythagoras and live by Pythagorean teachings. The later first-century Neopythagorean philosopher Moderatus of Gades expanded on Pythagorean number philosophy and probably understood the soul as a "kind of mathematical harmony." The Neopythagorean mathematician and musicologist Nicomachus likewise expanded on Pythagorean numerology and music theory. Numenius of Apamea interpreted Plato's teachings in light of Pythagorean doctrines.

On art and architecture 

Greek sculpture sought to represent the permanent reality behind superficial appearances. Early Archaic sculpture represents life in simple forms, and may have been influenced by the earliest Greek natural philosophies. The Greeks generally believed that nature expressed itself in ideal forms and was represented by a type, which was mathematically calculated. When dimensions changed, architects sought to relay permanence through mathematics. Maurice Bowra believes that these ideas influenced the theory of Pythagoras and his students, who believed that "all things are numbers".

During the sixth century BC, the number philosophy of the Pythagoreans triggered a revolution in Greek sculpture. Greek sculptors and architects attempted to find the mathematical relation (canon) behind aesthetic perfection. Possibly drawing on the ideas of Pythagoras, the sculptor Polykleitos wrote in his Canon that beauty consists in the proportion, not of the elements (materials), but of the interrelation of parts with one another and with the whole. In the Greek architectural orders, every element was calculated and constructed by mathematical relations. Rhys Carpenter states that the ratio 2:1 was "the generative ratio of the Doric order, and in Hellenistic times an ordinary Doric colonnade, beats out a rhythm of notes."

The oldest known building designed according to Pythagorean teachings is the Porta Maggiore Basilica, a subterranean basilica which was built during the reign of the Roman emperor Nero as a secret place of worship for Pythagoreans. The basilica was built underground because of the Pythagorean emphasis on secrecy and also because of the legend that Pythagoras had sequestered himself in a cave on Samos. The basilica's apse is in the east and its atrium in the west out of respect for the rising sun. It has a narrow entrance leading to a small pool where the initiates could purify themselves. The building is also designed according to Pythagorean numerology, with each table in the sanctuary providing seats for seven people. Three aisles lead to a single altar, symbolizing the three parts of the soul approaching the unity of Apollo. The apse depicts a scene of the poet Sappho leaping off the Leucadian cliffs, clutching her lyre to her breast, while Apollo stands beneath her, extending his right hand in a gesture of protection, symbolizing Pythagorean teachings about the immortality of the soul. The interior of the sanctuary is almost entirely white because the color white was regarded by Pythagoreans as sacred.

The emperor Hadrian's Pantheon in Rome was also built based on Pythagorean numerology. The temple's circular plan, central axis, hemispherical dome, and alignment with the four cardinal directions symbolize Pythagorean views on the order of the universe. The single oculus at the top of the dome symbolizes the monad and the sun-god Apollo. The twenty-eight ribs extending from the oculus symbolize the moon, because twenty-eight was the same number of months on the Pythagorean lunar calendar. The five coffered rings beneath the ribs represent the marriage of the sun and moon.

In early Christianity 
Many early Christians had a deep respect for Pythagoras. Eusebius ( 260 –  340 AD), bishop of Caesarea, praises Pythagoras in his Against Hierokles for his rule of silence, his frugality, his "extraordinary" morality, and his wise teachings. In another work, Eusebius compares Pythagoras to Moses. In one of his letter, the Church Father Jerome ( 347 – 420 AD) praises Pythagoras for his wisdom and, in another letter, he credits Pythagoras for his belief in the immortality of the soul, which he suggests Christians inherited from him. Augustine of Hippo (354 – 430 AD) rejected Pythagoras's teaching of metempsychosis without explicitly naming him, but otherwise expressed admiration for him. In On the Trinity, Augustine lauds the fact that Pythagoras was humble enough to call himself a philosophos or "lover of wisdom" rather than a "sage". In another passage, Augustine defends Pythagoras's reputation, arguing that Pythagoras certainly never taught the doctrine of metempsychosis.

Influence after antiquity

In the Middle Ages 

During the Middle Ages, Pythagoras was revered as the founder of mathematics and music, two of the Seven Liberal Arts. He appears in numerous medieval depictions, in illuminated manuscripts and in the relief sculptures on the portal of the Cathedral of Chartres. The Timaeus was the only dialogue of Plato to survive in Latin translation in western Europe, which led William of Conches (c. 1080–1160) to declare that Plato was Pythagorean. In the 1430s, the Camaldolese friar Ambrose Traversari translated Diogenes Laërtius's Lives and Opinions of Eminent Philosophers from Greek into Latin and, in the 1460s, the philosopher Marsilio Ficino translated Porphyry and Iamblichus's Lives of Pythagoras into Latin as well, thereby allowing them to be read and studied by western scholars. In 1494, the Greek Neopythagorean scholar Constantine Lascaris published The Golden Verses of Pythagoras, translated into Latin, with a printed edition of his Grammatica, thereby bringing them to a widespread audience. In 1499, he published the first Renaissance biography of Pythagoras in his work Vitae illustrium philosophorum siculorum et calabrorum, issued in Messina.

On modern science 
In his preface to his book On the Revolution of the Heavenly Spheres (1543), Nicolaus Copernicus cites various Pythagoreans as the most important influences on the development of his heliocentric model of the universe, deliberately omitting mention of Aristarchus of Samos, a non-Pythagorean astronomer who had developed a fully heliocentric model in the fourth century BC, in effort to portray his model as fundamentally Pythagorean. Johannes Kepler considered himself to be a Pythagorean. He believed in the Pythagorean doctrine of musica universalis and it was his search for the mathematical equations behind this doctrine that led to his discovery of the laws of planetary motion. Kepler titled his book on the subject Harmonices Mundi (Harmonics of the World), after the Pythagorean teaching that had inspired him. Near the conclusion of the book, Kepler describes himself falling asleep to the sound of the heavenly music, "warmed by having drunk a generous draught... from the cup of Pythagoras." He also called Pythagoras the "grandfather" of all Copernicans.

Isaac Newton firmly believed in the Pythagorean teaching of the mathematical harmony and order of the universe. Though Newton was notorious for rarely giving others credit for their discoveries, he attributed the discovery of the Law of Universal Gravitation to Pythagoras. Albert Einstein believed that a scientist may also be "a Platonist or a Pythagorean insofar as he considers the viewpoint of logical simplicity as an indispensable and effective tool of his research." The English philosopher Alfred North Whitehead argued that "In a sense, Plato and Pythagoras stand nearer to modern physical science than does Aristotle. The two former were mathematicians, whereas Aristotle was the son of a doctor". By this measure, Whitehead declared that Einstein and other modern scientists like him are "following the pure Pythagorean tradition."

On vegetarianism 

A fictionalized portrayal of Pythagoras appears in Book XV of Ovid's Metamorphoses, in which he delivers a speech imploring his followers to adhere to a strictly vegetarian diet. It was through Arthur Golding's 1567 English translation of Ovid's Metamorphoses that Pythagoras was best known to English-speakers throughout the early modern period. John Donne's Progress of the Soul discusses the implications of the doctrines expounded in the speech, and Michel de Montaigne quoted the speech no less than three times in his treatise "Of Cruelty" to voice his moral objections against the mistreatment of animals. William Shakespeare references the speech in his play The Merchant of Venice. John Dryden included a translation of the scene with Pythagoras in his 1700 work Fables, Ancient and Modern, and John Gay's 1726 fable "Pythagoras and the Countryman" reiterates its major themes, linking carnivorism with tyranny. Lord Chesterfield records that his conversion to vegetarianism had been motivated by reading Pythagoras's speech in Ovid's Metamorphoses. Until the word vegetarianism was coined in the 1840s, vegetarians were referred to in English as "Pythagoreans". Percy Bysshe Shelley wrote an ode entitled "To the Pythagorean Diet", and Leo Tolstoy adopted the Pythagorean diet himself.

On Western esotericism 
Early modern European esotericism drew heavily on the teachings of Pythagoras. The German humanist scholar Johannes Reuchlin (1455–1522) synthesized Pythagoreanism with Christian theology and Jewish Kabbalah, arguing that Kabbalah and Pythagoreanism were both inspired by Mosaic tradition and that Pythagoras was therefore a kabbalist. In his dialogue De verbo mirifico (1494), Reuchlin compared the Pythagorean tetractys to the ineffable divine name YHWH, ascribing each of the four letters of the tetragrammaton a symbolic meaning according to Pythagorean mystical teachings.

Heinrich Cornelius Agrippa's popular and influential three-volume treatise De Occulta Philosophia cites Pythagoras as a "religious magi" and indicates that Pythagoras's mystical numerology operates on a supercelestial level. The freemasons deliberately modeled their society on the community founded by Pythagoras at Croton. Rosicrucianism used Pythagorean symbolism, as did Robert Fludd (1574–1637), who believed his own musical writings to have been inspired by Pythagoras. John Dee was heavily influenced by Pythagorean ideology, particularly the teaching that all things are made of numbers. Adam Weishaupt, the founder of the Illuminati, was a strong admirer of Pythagoras and, in his book Pythagoras (1787), he advocated that society should be reformed to be more like Pythagoras's commune at Croton. Wolfgang Amadeus Mozart incorporated Masonic and Pythagorean symbolism into his opera The Magic Flute. Sylvain Maréchal, in his six-volume 1799 biography The Voyages of Pythagoras, declared that all revolutionaries in all time periods are the "heirs of Pythagoras".

On literature 

Dante Alighieri was fascinated by Pythagorean numerology and based his descriptions of Hell, Purgatory, and Heaven on Pythagorean numbers. Dante wrote that Pythagoras saw Unity as Good and Plurality as Evil and, in Paradiso XV, 56–57, he declares: "five and six, if understood, ray forth from unity." The number eleven and its multiples are found throughout the Divine Comedy, each book of which has thirty-three cantos, except for the Inferno, which has thirty-four, the first of which serves as a general introduction. Dante describes the ninth and tenth bolgias in the Eighth Circle of Hell as being twenty-two miles and eleven miles respectively, which correspond to the fraction , which was the Pythagorean approximation of pi.

The Transcendentalists read the ancient Lives of Pythagoras as guides on how to live a model life. Henry David Thoreau was impacted by Thomas Taylor's translations of Iamblichus's Life of Pythagoras and Stobaeus's Pythagoric Sayings and his views on nature may have been influenced by the Pythagorean idea of images corresponding to archetypes. The Pythagorean teaching of musica universalis is a recurring theme throughout Thoreau's magnum opus, Walden.

See also 
 Cosmos
 Ex pede Herculem
 Isopsephy (gematria)
 List of things named after Pythagoras
 Lute of Pythagoras
 Pythagoras tree (fractal)
 Pythagorean comma
 Pythagorean cup
 Pythagorean triple
 Pythagoras (sculptor)
 Sacred geometry

References

Footnotes

Citations

Works cited 
Only a few relevant source texts deal with Pythagoras and the Pythagoreans; most are available in different translations. Later texts usually build solely upon information in these works.

Classical sources

Diogenes Laërtius, Vitae philosophorum VIII (Lives of Eminent Philosophers), c. 200 AD, which in turn references the lost doxography by Alexander Polyhistor — 
Porphyry, Vita Pythagorae (Life of Pythagoras), c. 270 AD — Porphyry, Life of Pythagoras, translated by Kenneth Sylvan Guthrie (1920)
Iamblichus, De Vita Pythagorica (On the Pythagorean Life), c. 300 AD — Iamblichus, Life of Pythagoras, translated by Kenneth Sylvan Guthrie (1920)
Apuleius, following Aristoxenus, writes about Pythagoras in Apologia, c. 150 AD, including a story of his being taught by Zoroaster—a story also found in Clement of Alexandria. 
Hierocles of Alexandria, Golden Verses of Pythagoras, c. 430 AD

Modern secondary sources

External links 

"Pythagoras of Samos", The MacTutor History of Mathematics archive, School of Mathematics and Statistics, University of St Andrews, Scotland
"Pythagoras and the Pythagoreans, Fragments and Commentary", Arthur Fairbanks Hanover Historical Texts Project, Hanover College Department of History
"Pythagoras and the Pythagoreans", Department of Mathematics, Texas A&M University
 "Pythagoras and Pythagoreanism", The Catholic Encyclopedia
 
 

 
570s BC births
490s BC deaths
6th-century BC Greek people
6th-century BC mathematicians
6th-century BC philosophers
5th-century BC Greek people
5th-century BC mathematicians
5th-century BC philosophers
Ancient Greek geometers
Ancient Greek metaphysicians
Ancient Greek music theorists
Ancient Greek philosophers of mind
Ancient Greek political refugees
Ancient Greek shamans
Ancient Samians
Esotericists
Founders of religions
Numerologists
Pythagoreans
6th-century BC religious leaders
5th-century BC religious leaders